Marc Surer (born 18 September 1951 in Arisdorf) is a former racing driver from Switzerland currently working as TV commentator and racing school instructor. He participated in 88 Formula One World Championship Grands Prix, debuting on 9 September 1979.  He scored a total of 17 championship points.

Racing career
Surer started his career in karting in 1972. Due to the racing ban established in Switzerland after the 1955 Le Mans disaster, he moved to Germany in 1974, where he finished second in the local Formula Vee Championship. In 1976, he switched to European Formula 3, where he was noticed by Jochen Neerpasch, who hired him as a member of the BMW Junior Team alongside Eddie Cheever and Manfred Winkelhock. In 1978, he finished second in the Formula 2 Championship, eventually winning the series the following year in a works March-BMW.

Surer's debut in Formula 1 took place at the end of 1979 and was somewhat troubled. He broke his legs in qualifying at the South African Grand Prix in an ATS at Kyalami in 1980 and again racing there in 1981 for Ensign. He recovered to give Ensign their best result with a 4th-place finish at the 1981 Brazilian Grand Prix, also setting the fastest lap of the race. He later drove for Theodore before establishing himself at Arrows for a couple of seasons, until BMW's support earned him a seat at Brabham for 1985. Surer returned to Arrows in 1986 but eventually retired from Formula One halfway through the season due to serious accident at the 1986 ADAC Hessen-Rallye in his Ford RS200 severely injured him and killed his co-driver and friend Michel Wyder. BMW retained him as a driver, coach and later director of motorsport activities. In 1994 and 1995, Surer, alongside Johnny Cecotto and Jo Winkelhock, won the German Super Touring Car Championship.

In 1996, Surer began working as a television commentator at all Formula 1 events for Sky Sport (Germany) (formerly known as DF1 and Premiere) next to the lead commentator Jacques Schulz. After Schulz's withdrawal prior to the 2013 season, he has remained commentator alongside Sascha Roos.

Formula One all-time ranking
In 2016, in an academic paper that reported a mathematical modeling study that assessed the relative influence of driver and machine, Surer was ranked the 17th best Formula One driver of all time.

Personal life
Surer has been married twice to former Playboy models, first to Playmate Jolanda Egger, and then to Christina Surer between 1997 and 2000. On 3 December 2011 he married his longtime partner Silvia Renée Arias.

Racing record

Career summary

† As Surer was a guest driver, he was ineligible for championship points.

Complete European Formula Two Championship results
(key) (Races in bold indicate pole position; races in italics indicate fastest lap)

Complete Formula One World Championship results
(key) (races in italics indicate fastest lap)

Complete 24 Hours of Le Mans results

Sources
Profile at www.grandprix.com

References

1951 births
Living people
Swiss racing drivers
Swiss Formula One drivers
European Formula Two Championship drivers
Ensign Formula One drivers
ATS Wheels Formula One drivers
Theodore Formula One drivers
Arrows Formula One drivers
Brabham Formula One drivers
24 Hours of Le Mans drivers
24 Hours of Spa drivers
Porsche Supercup drivers
World Sportscar Championship drivers
Formula One journalists and reporters
Sportspeople from Basel-Landschaft
Swiss motorsport people
Schnitzer Motorsport drivers
Sauber Motorsport drivers